Freddie Scappaticci (born c. 1946 Belfast) is a purported former high-level double agent in the Provisional Irish Republican Army (IRA), known by the codename "Stakeknife".

Early life
Scappaticci was born around 1946 and grew up in the Markets area of Belfast, the son of Daniel Scappaticci, an Italian immigrant to the city in the 1920s. In 1962, at the age of 16, he was encouraged to sign for the football club Nottingham Forest although his father is said to have resisted the idea. He took up work as a bricklayer.

He was fined for riotous assembly in 1970 after being caught up in the Troubles and, a year later, was interned without trial at the age of 25 as part of Operation Demetrius. Among those interned with him were figures later to become prominent in the republican movement, such as Ivor Bell, Gerry Adams, and Alex Maskey. He was released from detention in 1974 and was by this time a member of the Provisional IRA.

IRA career
By 1980, Scappaticci was a lead member in the Internal Security Unit (ISU) for the IRA Northern Command. The ISU was a unit tasked with counter-intelligence and the investigation of leaks within the IRA along with the exposure of moles/informers (also known as "touts"). Via the ISU, Scappaticci played a key role in investigating suspected informers, conducting inquiries into operations suspected of being compromised, debriefing of IRA volunteers released from Royal Ulster Constabulary and British Army questioning, and vetting of potential IRA recruits. The ISU has also been referred to as the "Nutting Squad". Various killings as a result of ISU activities have been attributed to Scappaticci.

After the original allegations broke in 2003, Scappaticci, by now living in the Riverdale area of West Belfast, claimed his involvement with the IRA ended in 1990 due to his wife's illness. He denied that he had ever been linked to any facet of the British intelligence services, including the Force Research Unit.

Involvement with British Intelligence
Scappaticci's first involvement with British Intelligence is alleged to have been in 1978, two years before the Force Research Unit (FRU) was formed in 1980. He is said to have worked as an agent for the Royal Ulster Constabulary (RUC) Special Branch. The role of the FRU was to centralise Army Intelligence under the Intelligence Corps.

The former FRU agent turned whistleblower using the pseudonym "Martin Ingram" has said in his 2004 book Stakeknife that Scappaticci eventually developed into an agent handled by British Army Intelligence via the FRU.  Ingram says that Scappaticci's activities as a high-grade intelligence source came to his attention in 1982 after Scappaticci was detained for a drunk driving offence. In 2003, Scappaticci was alleged to have volunteered as an informer in 1978 after being assaulted in an argument with a fellow IRA member. Ingram paints Scappaticci at this time as "the crown jewels", (the best) agent handled by the FRU. He cites a number of allegations against Scappaticci. His accusations centre on various individuals who died as a result of the activities of the ISU between 1980 and 1990. Ingram also alleges that Scappaticci disclosed information to British intelligence on IRA operations during the time period, involving:

IRA members involved in the kidnapping of wealthy Irish supermarket magnate Ben Dunne in 1981. Ingram alleges that Scappaticci was influential in identifying his kidnappers to the authorities.
the attempted kidnapping of Galen Weston, a Canadian born business tycoon in 1983. Weston kept a manor outside Dublin where the kidnapping was to take place.
the kidnapping of supermarket boss Don Tidey from his home in Rathfarnham in Dublin. Ingram alleges that Scappaticci tipped off the FRU on the details of the kidnapping which eventually resulted in the killings of a trainee Garda Síochána (Gary Sheehan) and an Irish Army soldier (Private Patrick Kelly).

Aside from providing intelligence to the FRU, Scappaticci is alleged to have worked closely with his FRU handlers throughout the 1980s and 1990s to protect and promote his position within the IRA. The controversy that has arisen centres on Ingram's allegation that the FRU killed individuals who might have exposed Scappaticci as an informer.

Involvement with the Cook Report
In 1993 Scappaticci approached the ITV programme The Cook Report and agreed to an interview on his activities in the IRA and the alleged role of Martin McGuinness in the organisation.  The first interview took place on 26 August 1993 in the car park of the Culloden Hotel in Cultra, County Down.  This interview was, unknown to Scappaticci, recorded and eventually found its way into an edition of the programme. The interview was posted on the World Wide Web as the 2003 allegations against Scappaticci surfaced.

Scappaticci appears to give intimate details of the modus operandi of the IRA's Northern Command, indicated some of his previous involvement in the organisation and alleges, amongst other things, that Martin McGuinness was involved in the death of Frank Hegarty – an IRA volunteer who had been killed as an informer by the IRA in 1986. It has since been alleged that Scappaticci knew the intimate details of Hegarty's killing because, as part of his duties in the ISU, he had reportedly been involved in the interrogation and execution of Hegarty regarding a large Libyan arms cache, which the Gardaí found. Ingram stated that Hegarty was a FRU agent whom other FRU members had encouraged to rise through the organisation and gain the confidence of key IRA members.

Involvement with the Stevens Report
Things deteriorated for Scappaticci when Sir John Stevens, the Metropolitan police commissioner who has been probing RUC and British Army collusion with loyalist paramilitaries in the killing of Protestant student, Brian Adam Lambert in 1987 and the killing of solicitor Pat Finucane in 1989, revealed that he knew of his existence. In April 2004, Stevens signalled that he intended to question Scappaticci as part of the third Stevens inquiry.

A report in a February 2007 edition of the Belfast News Letter reported that a cassette recording allegedly of Scappaticci talking about the number of murders he was involved in via the "Nutting Squad", as well as his work as an Army agent, had been lodged with the PSNI in 2004 and subsequently passed to the Stevens Inquiry in 2005. It is unclear whether this audio is a recording made via the Cook Report investigation. There were several inconsistencies with the various media reports alleging that Scappaticci was Stakeknife. The Provisional IRA reportedly assured Scappaticci of their belief in his denials and has issued public statements suggesting that the announcement of the former as a "tout" was a stunt by the British government to undermine Sinn Féin and the Republican movement.

In January 2018, Scappaticci was arrested by police regarding offences including murder and abduction, but was released on bail. 
On 5 December 2018, Westminster Magistrates’ Court sentenced Scappaticci to 3 months imprisonment, suspended for 1 year, after he pleaded guilty to possessing "extreme pornographic images". The pornographic materials were uncovered during an investigation into serious crime during the Troubles.

See also
 Murder of Thomas Oliver

References

External links
 Audio tape recording of Scappaticci interview, The Cook Report], cryptome.quintessenz.at/mirror/scappaticci.htm; accessed 5 June 2014.
 Transcript of Scappaticci speaking to the Cook Report, cryptome.org; accessed 5 June 2014.
 Rebuttal to "Stakeknife" allegations , newspapersoc.org.uk; 19 May 2003
 Scappaticci profile, Sunday Business Post, 31 August 2003. 
 Transcript of 1993 UTV Insight programme, cryptome.quintessenz.at/mirror/scap-clive.htm; accessed 5 June 2014. 

1940s births
Living people
Paramilitaries from Belfast
Provisional Irish Republican Army members
Republicans imprisoned during the Northern Ireland conflict
People from Northern Ireland of Italian descent
Date of birth missing (living people)
Bricklayers
Police informants
Double agents